Basalt Island or Fo Shek Chau is an island of Hong Kong and administratively part of Sai Kung District. Together with Wang Chau and Bluff Island, it forms the Ung Kong Group and is part of Hong Kong Global Geopark.

Geography
Basalt Island is located south of Town Island and Wang Chau, east of Bluff Island and north of the Ninepin Group. Its highest elevation is 174 m. Notably, despite its name is “Basalt Island”, the rocks that forms the island are indeed rhyolitic tuff.

History
On 21December 1948, Basalt Island was the site of the first commercial airliner crash in Hong Kong, in which all 28 passengers, including five women, one child and seven crew, were killed. CNAC flight XT-104 from Shanghai to Hong Kong Kai Tak Airport was operated by a C-54 Skymaster. Fog over the island was the official cause of the crash.

Quentin Roosevelt II, the grandson of American president Theodore Roosevelt and then Senior Vice President of China National Aviation Corporation (CNAC), and Paul Yung, elder brother of Rong Yiren who was later to become Vice-President of the People's Republic of China, were among the casualties.

Debris remains near the site of the crash.

Conservation
The island was zoned as a Site of Special Scientific Interest in 1979.

The Ung Kong Group Special Area covers 176.8 hectares and was designated in 2011. It consists of Basalt Island, Bluff Island, Wang Chau, their surrounding islets, and Kam Chung Ngam in the southern part of Jin Island. The geology of the area is characterised by volcanic rocks of the Cretaceous periods.

See also

 Basalt

References

Further reading
 Hong Kong's Roosevelt Connection Basalt Island's Air Crash (archive)
 New York Times article about the crash
 Additional details about the flight

External links

 Article about rock formations (archive) 

Uninhabited islands of Hong Kong
Sai Kung District
Hong Kong UNESCO Global Geopark
Columnar basalts
Islands of Hong Kong